Hippolyte Emmanuel Boulenger (3 December 1837 – 4 July 1874) was a Belgian landscape painter influenced by the French Barbizon school, considered to be "the Belgian Corot".

Biography
Hippolyte Boulenger was born to French parents in Tournai in 1837. He spent his youth in Tournai and lived in Paris between 1850 and 1853, where he studied drawing. In 1853, after he became an orphan, he went to Brussels to work at a design atelier. In the evening, he studied at the Académie Royale des Beaux-Arts with Joseph Quinaux, a landscape painter.

He met portrait painter Camille van Camp in 1863, who became a mentor and mecenas. He showed his first painting in the Brussels Salon the same year. Boulenger went to Tervuren in 1864, and called round him a group of likeminded painters gathered there, the School van Tervuren, a Belgian version of the Barbizon school, of which he became the leading artist. At the time, his leading model was Jean-François Millet, although his later work was closer to that of Corot. By 1866, he was famous in Belgian art circles.

He married in 1868 and moved to Zaventem, but returned to Tervuren in 1870. These years were his best and most fruitful period, with e.g. the painting De oude Haagbeukdreef. Tervuren, which won him the Gold Medal of the 1872 Salon of Brussels. In this period, he travelled in Belgium and abroad, painting along the River Meuse. It was his suggestion that led to the creation of the Société Libre des Beaux-Arts, an art circle of young Belgian artists, including Alfred Verwee, Félicien Rops, and Constantin Meunier, with honorary members from abroad like Corot and Millet, but also Honoré Daumier, Gustave Courbet and Willem Maris.

By 1869, he began to suffer from epilepsy. Coupled with alcohol abuse, this led to an early death, in 1874 in a hotel in Brussels.

Works

Josaphat Valley at Schaarbeek, 1868, Royal Museum of Fine Arts, Antwerp
After the evening storm, 1869, Museum of Fine Arts, Ghent
The Inundation, 1871, Royal Museums of Fine Arts of Belgium, Brussels (this museum has a substantial collection of works by Boulenger, including the 1871 Mass of Saint-Hubert)

Bibliography
 P. & V. Berko, "Dictionary of Belgian painters born between 1750 & 1875", Knokke 1981, pp. 63–64.

Notes

1837 births
1874 deaths
Artists from Tournai
Belgian landscape painters
Realist painters
19th-century Belgian painters
19th-century Belgian male artists
Académie Royale des Beaux-Arts alumni